The Tver electoral district was a constituency created for the 1917 Russian Constituent Assembly election.

The electoral district covered the Tver Governorate. U.S. historian Oliver Henry Radkey, who is the source for the results table below, lists the Tver result as 'somewhat incomplete'. Russkoe Slovo reported that the election was conducted orderly, whilst the SR organ Delo Naroda stated that Bolsheviks disrupted the polls in Rzhev uezd. A farmer candidate list was denied registration to contest the election in Tver.

Results

References

Electoral districts of the Russian Constituent Assembly election, 1917
Tver Governorate